Rajzel Żychlińsky (July 27, 1910 – June 13, 2001) was a Polish-born writer of poetry in Yiddish. She published seven collections over six decades. Her first two collections were published in Warsaw in 1936 and 1939, just prior to World War II. She survived the war by fleeing eastward to the Soviet Union, but many members of her immediate family were murdered in the Holocaust. Her postwar poetry, mostly written in the United States, was strongly influenced by these events.

Biography
Żychlińsky was born in Gąbin, Poland to Mordechai Żychlińsky and Debora Żychlińska (née Appel). Both her parents were Jewish. Her mother in particular was devout and descended from a family from which many rabbis had emerged. Żychlińsky completed public grade school in Gąbin in 1923. Gąbin had no higher schools for girls, but she continued her education through private tutors. By then Żychlińsky was writing poetry in Polish and in Yiddish. Her first poem to be published appeared about 1927 in the Folkstsaytung, which was a Yiddish-language daily newspaper in Warsaw, Poland's largest city. In the early 1930s, Żychlińsky moved to Włocławek; she worked there in an orphanage. By 1936 she was working at a bank in Warsaw. Her first book of poems, Lider [Poems], was published in 1936 by the Yiddish PEN Club. It had an introduction by one of her mentors, the noted Polish poet and playwright Itzik Manger. In 1937, she won the Reuben Ludwig Award of the Yiddish-American literary publication Inzikh. In early 1939 her second book, Der regn zingt [The Rain Sings], was published in Warsaw.

Germany initiated World War II by invading Poland from the west on September 1, 1939, and the Soviet Union invaded from the east sixteen days later. Żychlińsky and friends hired a cab and, for an extraordinary payment of 400 złoty, had the driver drive them east to the Bug River. There she had a boat take her across the river into the zone of Soviet-occupied Poland, near Białystok. Most of the poet's family remained in the German-occupied zone. Her mother, three siblings, and other family members ultimately perished in the gas chambers of the Chełmno extermination camp. She lived in Lvov (L’viv) for a time. She then moved to Kolomyya, where she lived with the Kanter family. In January, 1941 she married Isaac Kanter. Isaac Kanter was a well-read psychiatrist who also wrote; he knew Żychlińsky from Warsaw. The German invasion of the Soviet Union commenced in June, 1941. Żychlińsky and her husband fled eastward again, ultimately landing near Kazan. Isaac Kanter served as a doctor in the Soviet army during the war. On February 15, 1943, their son, Marek, was born.

After the war in 1945, Żychlińsky and her family returned to Poland. She published her third volume of poetry, Tsu loytere bregn [To Clear Shores],  there in 1948. It would be fifteen years before she published the fourth. In 1948 the family moved to Paris, France. They had found postwar Poland to be unwelcoming to the return of Jewish survivors of the Holocaust. Finally, in 1951 she and her family emigrated to the United States, and lived in Manhattan and in Brooklyn. There she found work, and, at the same time, attended City College of New York. Subsequently, she and her family resided in various parts of the United States, including Florida and California, as well as spending some time in Canada.

Żychlińsky was fluent in five languages. After the war and the nearly total elimination of the Yiddish-speaking communities in Europe, she continued to write exclusively in Yiddish. Karina von Tippelskirch writes, "Zychlinsky wrote poems only in Yiddish, the mameloshn—her mother tongue. It linked the poet and her mother, and it remains the language that can carry the Eastern European Jewish world beyond its destruction by the Holocaust into the present." Von Tippelskirch also wrote: "Rajzel Zychlinsky (1910–2001) is considered one of the greatest Yiddish poets of the 20th century and a master of the small poetic form."

Żychlińsky was awarded the Itzik Manger Prize for contributions to Yiddish letters at a ceremony in Tel Aviv on June 9, 1975. Nonetheless she is not famous even in Yiddish-speaking circles. Elvira Groezinger writes, "The reason for Zychlinsky's incomprehensible lack of fame may be traced to her life choices. She was not part of the mainstream of Yiddish poets, publishers, and influential people. ... Having no networks to support her career, she remained a lifelong loner and outsider." Barnett Zumoff writes that "she was the most authentic and original of the female Yiddish poets."

"God Hid His Face"
The volume of English translations takes its title from the poem "God Hid His Face", which has been called "one of her most powerful and desolate." von Tippelskirch considers the poem in the larger context of faith in god following the Holocaust: "Like many writers after the Holocaust, among them Itzik Manger and Zvi Kolitz (1946) in his famous 'Yosl Rakover Talks to God', Zychlinsky struggles with faith, often referring to God as blind or absent." The poem's title also appears in Zvi Kolitz' text.

In English translation by Aaron Kramer:
God Hid His Face
All the roads led to death,
all the roads.

All the winds breathed betrayal,
all the winds.

At all the doorways angry dogs barked,
at all the doorways.

All the waters laughed at us,
all the waters.

All the nights fattened on our dread,
all the nights.

And the heavens were bare and empty,
all the heavens.

God hid his face.

Bibliography

Poetry collections
Żychlińsky published seven collections of her poetry:
 With an introduction by Itsik Manger.

English translations
A volume of translations of her poems has been published in English:
  Introductory essay by Emanuel S. Goldsmith.

Translations of her poetry into English have been included in several anthologies:
 This online anthology includes English translations for thirteen of Żychlińsky's prewar poems.

 With 26 poems, Żychlińsky is the best-represented poet in this anthology. It was published after Kramer's death.
 Bilingual collection of poems in the original Yiddish and in English translation by Zumoff. Includes "My Mother".

Polish translations
Polish translations of some poems appear in the anthology:

German translations

 Karina von Tippelskirch's name was formerly Kranhold.

French translations
 Translation of Żychlińsky's volume Shvaygndike tirn. The translator Rachel Ertel has been called "unquestionably the most distinguished scholar of Yiddish culture in France".

Monographs
 Based on von Tippelskirch's 1997 doctoral dissertation.

See also

 Yiddish literature
 List of Yiddish language poets

References

Further reading
 Biography and bibliography.
 Żychlińsky is one of the individuals featured in this film, which "tells the story of a group of 50 children of survivors of Shoah, who return to their parents village in Poland in acts of reconciliation, healing and discovery."

American Ashkenazi Jews
American poetry in immigrant languages
American women poets
Yiddish-language poets
Polish women poets
City College of New York alumni
American people of Polish-Jewish descent
Jewish American poets
Jewish women writers
1910 births
2001 deaths
People from Gąbin
Polish Ashkenazi Jews
20th-century American poets
20th-century Polish poets
20th-century American women writers
20th-century Polish women
20th-century American Jews
Itzik Manger Prize recipients